.

The 2023 Uzbekistan Super League (known as the Coca-Cola Uzbekistan Super League for sponsorship reasons) was the 32nd season of top-level football in Uzbekistan since its establishment on 1992. Pakhtakor Tashkent are the defending champions from the 2022 campaign. FK Andijon, FK Turon Yaypan and FK Buxoro were the three teams promoted to the 2023 Super League. The first matches will take place on March 3, 2023.

Teams

Managerial changes

Foreign players

The number of foreign players is restricted to five per USL team. A team can use only five foreign players on the field in each game.

In bold: Players that have been capped for their national team.

League table

Results

Results table

Results by match played

Positions by round

Season Statistics
 First goal of the season: Shakhzod Ubaydullaev for Neftchi Fergana against Kokand 1912

Goalscorers

Clean sheets

Attendances

By round

By team

See also
2023 Uzbekistan Pro League 
2023 Uzbekistan First League 
2023 Uzbekistan Second League
2023 Uzbekistan Cup 
2023 Uzbekistan League Cup

References

External links
 Official website 

Uzbekistan
Uzbekistan Super League seasons
2023 in Uzbekistani football